Godfrey may refer to:

People
 Godfrey (name), a given name and surname
 Godfrey (comedian), American comedian, actor

Places

In the United States
 Godfrey, Georgia, an unincorporated community
 Godfrey, Illinois, a village
 Godfrey, Kansas, an unincorporated community
 Godfrey, Washington, a ghost town
 Godfrey, West Virginia, an unincorporated community

Elsewhere
 Godfrey, Ontario, a Canadian community

Fiction
 Glorious Godfrey, often known just by the name "Godfrey", a DC Comics supervillain
 Private Godfrey, a character from Dad's Army
Queen Goodfey, supporting character of Mysticons, in which she is the kind and brave ruler of the people of Drake City on planet Gemina.